Live '99 is the first Live album by Polish singer Edyta Górniak.

Background

The songs were recorded during Edyta Górniak's 1999 tour through Poland. The backing vocals were sung by Ania Szarmach and Kasia Cerekwicka who are now also well known singers in Poland and by Krzysztof Pietrzak.

Track listing

 Intro (1:36)
 Perfect Moment (3:50)
 When You Come Back to Me (4:58)
 Dotyk (4:33)
 The Day I Get Over You (8:19)
 Stop! (5:05)
 Jestem kobietą (4:16)
 I Don't Know What's On Your Mind (5:03)
 Miles & Miles Away (5:35)
 Hunting High & Low (4:07)
 To nie ja (4:22)
 Anything (4:31)
 Dziś prawdziwych cyganów już nie ma (3:27)
 Gone (6:56)

Promo singles 

 Stop! (1999)
 Hunting High & Low (2000)

Edyta Górniak albums
1999 live albums